Scott Mulder (born ) is a Canadian male  track cyclist, riding for the national team. He competed in the sprint, team sprint and keirin events at the 2011 UCI Track Cycling World Championships.

References

External links
 Profile at cyclingarchives.com

1992 births
Living people
Canadian track cyclists
Canadian male cyclists
Place of birth missing (living people)